Neils Walwin Holm (1866 - 1927?) was a West African photographer who later retrained as a barrister. He was "the pre-eminent photographer of Lagos, West Africa, from the 1890s until 1910".

Life
Holm was born in the Gold Coast. He left school in 1883, and was apprenticed to his cousins, who were professional photographers. Leaving them in 1885, he was commissioned by a German merchant who had imported photographic equipment for him to use. With his commission he managed to purchase the equipment, and moved to Lagos Colony in 1886.

He built a successful photographic business there, gaining early commissions from the colonial administration. He was the first in Lagos Colony to introduce dry plate, using plates manufactured in Ilford in England. He married in 1890, though his wife died in 1892.

In July 1893 Holm travelled to Britain for the first time, visiting a Pall Mall exhibition by the Photographic Society of Great Britain. On his return to Lagos, he advertised himself as a West African representative of UK manufacturers. He kept up transatlantic connections using a telegraphic cable address and advertisements in the British magazine Practical Photographer. In 1895 he was elected a member of the Royal Photographic Society, and in 1896 became a Fellow.

In 1900 he returned to London to attend the First Pan-African Conference. He visited London again in 1903.

In 1910 he gave up photography, and from 1910 to 1917 trained at the Middle Temple as a barrister for the Lagos courts.

References

1866 births
1927 deaths
Year of death uncertain
Gold Coast (British colony) people
Nigerian photographers
20th-century Nigerian lawyers
Members of the Middle Temple
Residents of Lagos